Attorney General Johnson may refer to:

George A. Johnson (1829–1894), Attorney General of California
Isaac Johnson (1803–1853), Attorney General of Louisiana
J. B. Johnson (Florida politician) (1868–1940), Attorney General of Florida
John Mercer Johnson (1818–1868), Attorney General of New Brunswick
Lee Johnson (Oregon judge) (born 1930), Attorney General of Oregon
Ovid F. Johnson (1807–1854), Attorney General of Pennsylvania
Pierre-Marc Johnson (born 1946), Attorney General of Quebec
Reverdy Johnson (1796–1876), Attorney General of the United States
Royal C. Johnson (1882–1939), Attorney General of South Dakota
Sveinbjorn Johnson (1883–1946), Attorney General of North Dakota
William Moore Johnson (1828–1918), Attorney General for Ireland

See also
General Johnson (disambiguation)
 Attorney General Johnston (disambiguation)
Helgi Johanneson (1906–1994), Attorney General of North Dakota